Outside the Frame is the second album by Canadian country music singer Paul Brandt. The album has been certified Platinum by the CRIA. The album's four singles — "A Little in Love", "What's Come Over You", "Yeah!", and "Outside the Frame" — all charted in the top ten on the Canadian RPM Country Tracks charts, where they reached #1, #10, #5, and #3, respectively.  None of these were Top 40 hits in the U.S., however.

Track listing
"Chain Reaction" (Paul Brandt, Josh Leo, Rick Bowles) - 2:39
"A Little in Love" (Leo, Bowles) - 3:37
"What's Come Over You" (Gene Nelson, Doug Swander) - 3:29
"One" (Brandt, Kerry Chater, Lynn Gillespie Chater) - 3:36
"I Believe You" (Bob DiPiero, Tom Shapiro) - 3:29
"Yeah!" (Brandt, Steve Rosen) - 4:13
"We Are the One" (Brandt) - 2:50
feat. Kathy Mattea on background vocals
"Start Forever Over Again" (Brandt, Max D. Barnes) - 3:42
"Dry Eye" (Brandt, Leo, Bowles) - 3:55
"Outside the Frame" (Brandt, Rosen) - 3:48

Personnel
As listed in liner notes.

 Richard Bennett - acoustic guitar, electric guitar
 Liz Brandt - background vocals
 Paul Brandt - lead vocals, electric guitar
 Max Carl - background vocals
 John Catchings - cello
 Bill Cuomo - synthesizer
 Dan Dugmore - steel guitar
 Connie Ellisor - violin
 Larry Franklin - fiddle
 Rob Hajacos - fiddle
 Vicki Hampton - background vocals
 John Hobbs - keyboards, Hammond B-3 organ, Wurlitzer
 Dann Huff - electric guitar
 Greg Jennings - slide guitar
 Jeff King - electric guitar
 Josh Leo - electric guitar
 Carl Marsh - keyboards
 Brent Mason - electric guitar
 Kathy Mattea - background vocals on "We Are the One"
 Greg Morrow - drums, percussion
 Steve Rosen - keyboards
 Harry Stinson - background vocals
 Biff Watson - acoustic guitar
 Lonnie Wilson - drums
 Glenn Worf - bass guitar

Chart performance

References and external links

 [ allmusic.com]

Paul Brandt albums
1997 albums
Albums produced by Josh Leo
Reprise Records albums